Mostafa Haghipour  is an Iranian footballer who currently plays for Tractor Sazi in the Iran Pro League.

Club career
Haghipour joined Tractor Sazi F.C. in 2010, after spending the previous season at Damash Gilan F.C. in the Azadegan League.

 Assist Goals

References

Living people
Iranian footballers
Tractor S.C. players
Damash Gilan players
Saba players
Esteghlal Ahvaz players
1982 births
Association football midfielders